Methylenomycin may refer to either of two chemical compounds:

 Methylenomycin A
 Methylenomycin B